Erechthias fulguritella is a species of moth in the family Tineidae. It was described by Francis Walker in 1863. This species is endemic to New Zealand.

References

External links
Image of type specimen of Erechthias fulguritella

Moths described in 1863
Erechthiinae
Moths of New Zealand
Endemic fauna of New Zealand
Taxa named by Francis Walker (entomologist)
Endemic moths of New Zealand